Galley is a surname. Notable people with the surname include:

 Garry Galley, former National Hockey League player
 Gordon Galley, English footballer
 Jim Galley (1944–2012), an English former cricketer and rugby union player
 John Galley, English footballer
 Maurice Galley, English footballer
 Mel Galley (1948–2008), English guitarist
 Robert Galley (politician) (1921–2012), French politician
 Roy Galley, British politician
 William Galley, English footballer